Ocular rosacea is a manifestation of rosacea that affects the eyes and eyelids. Signs and symptoms generally consist of redness, irritation or burning of the eyes. Affected individuals may also feel that there is something, such as an eyelash, in the eye and frequently have redness of the nose and cheeks as well.

Those who have ocular rosacea may be treated with warm compresses, artificial tears and washing the area around the eye with warm water, including the eyelids, to help relieve symptoms. Additionally, oral antibiotics, typically doxycycline, may be prescribed. Some people with ocular rosacea feel that dietary restrictions of caffeine, spicy foods, and alcoholic beverages may reduce or eliminate symptoms.

Ocular rosacea may be caused by an overproliferation of the Demodex mites D. folliculorum and D. brevis, both frequently referred to as "eyelash mites".

Notes 
 Kunimoto, Derek Y, et al. The Wills Eye Manual, 4th ed. Lippincott, Philadelphia.2004.

References

External links
  emedicine

Eye diseases
Acneiform eruptions